Names of the Mayors for the Borough of Derby from the first that was chosen on 3 July 1638 by the king's charter then granted to the town. The two last bailiffs were the two first mayors, Mr Mellor being proclaimed 3 July 1638 to be the mayor until Michaelmas and twelve months after but he died on 5 February 1639 and Mr Hope served the year out.

The chief duties of the mayor are to chair Derby Council meetings and to attend the city's remembrance event, however the ceremonial duties can be considerable. In 2013 the cost of running the office was thought to be over £100,000. Derby's mayor wears a ceremonial chain that has been valued at over £1,000,000. The chain was originally worn by Chief Judges of the King's Bench. It was obtained for Derby's mayor to wear in 1850.

17th century
1638 Henry Mellor died 5 February. Mr Hope succeeded him and served the year out
1639 John Hope
1640 Edward Large
1641 Luke Whittington
1642 Henry Wandell
1643 Luke Whittington
1644 Luke Whittington
1645 Gervase Bennet
1646 John Dalton
1647 Robert Mellor
1648 Thomas Sleigh
1649 Edward Large
1650 John Parker
1651 William Willot
1652 John Dalton
1653 Thomas Youle
1654 Humphry Yates
1655 Thomas Sleigh
1656 Gilbert Ward
1657 Nathaniel Hallowes
1658 Edward Large He died and John Parker served the year out
1659 John Gisborne
1660 John Dunnidge
1661 Thomas Potter
1662 John Brookhouse
1663 Edward Walker
1664 Robert Wandel
1665 John Harryman
1666 Hugh Newton 
1667 Samuel Spateman
1668 John Dalton
1669 Humphry Yates
1670 James Ward
1671 John Spateman He died in the year and Roger Newton served it out
1672 Roger Newton
1673 Thomas Goodwin
1674 George Blackwell
1675 Edward Walker
1676 Samuel Spateman
1677 John Brookhouse
1678 Robert Wandel
1679 Roger Newton
1680 John Lord
1681 Edward Walker
1682 Roger Newton
1683 Thomas Goodwin
1684 John Dunnidge
1685 Joseph Worden
1686 Solomon Roberte
1687 Leonard Sad displaced 11 Jan by King James II and Halph Brough appointed
1688 John Cheshire
1689 Samuel Spateman
1690 Samuel Cheshire
1691 Samuel Fletcher
1692 John Lord
1693 Thomas Goodwin
1694 Henry Holmes
1695 Henry Noton
1696 Solomon Roberts
1697 William Franceys
1698 Thomas Goodwin He died 26 August and Thomas Carter served the year out
1699 William Franceys

18th century
1700 William Franceys
1701 Thomas Carter
1702 Joseph Bloodworth
1703 Francis Cockayne
1704 William Turner
1705 Thomas Bott
1706 Joseph Broughton
1707 Thomas Byram
1708 John Holmes
1709 Thomas Fisher
1710 Richard Ward
1711 Francis Cockayne
1712 Thomas Gisborne
1713 Joseph Broughton
1714 Thomas Fisher
1715 Thomas Rivett
1716 John Bagnold Thomas
1717 Thomas Geary
1718 John Holmes
1719 Richard Ward
1720 Hugh Bateman
1721 Francis Cockayne
1722 William Woolley
1723 Philip Parr
1724 Thomas Gisborne
1725 Samuel Cooper
1726 John Bagnold
1727 Thomas Houghton
1728 Robert Wagstaffe
1729 John Gisborne
1730 Isaac Borrow
1731 Nathaniel Edwards
1732 John Holmes
1733 Francis Cockayne
1734 Thomas Gisborne
1735 Samuel Cooper
1736 John Bagnold
1737 John Gisborne
1738 Robert Wagstaffe
1739 Robert Bakewell
1740 Joshua Smith
1741 Samuel Fox
1742 Isaac Borrow
1743 Thomas Gisborne
1744 Samuel Cooper
1745 Robert Hague 
1746 Humphrey Booth
1747 Henry Franceys He died 1 January and Humphrey Booth served the year out
1748 Matthew Howe
1749 Thomas Gisborne
1750 Joseph Bingham
1751 Robert Bakewell
1752 Humphrey Booth
1753 Matthew Howe
1754 Robert Bakewell
1755 William Evans
1756 Robert Bakewell
1757 John Bingham
1758 Samuel Crompton
1759 Robert Bakewell
1760 Joseph Bingham
1761 Thomas Rivett
1762 Thomas Milnes He died on 19 October and Joshua Smith served the year out
1763 John Heath
1764 Samuel Wilde
1765 William Evans
1766 Samuel Wilde
1767 Samuel Crompton
1761 William Evans
1769 Thomas Stamford
1770 Henry Flint
1771 Thomas Eaton
1772 John Heath
1773 William Edwards 
1774 Christopher Heath
1775 Robert Hope
1776 William Leaper
1777 Robert Hope He died and Samuel Crompton served the year out
1778 Francis Ashby
1779 Matthew Howe
1780 William Edwards

1781 John Hope
1782 Samuel Crompton
1783 Thomas Mather
1784 Francis Ashby
1785 William Edwards
1786 Henry Flint 
1787 John Hope
1788 Samuel Crompton 
1789 Thomas Mather 
1790 Francis Ashby
1791 Thomas Lowe
1792 John Crompton
1793 William Snowden
1794 Richard Leaper
1795 John Hope
1796 John Leaper Newton
1797 Rev Charles Stead Hope
1798 William Edwards
1799 Henry Browne

19th century

1800 John Crompton
1801 Samuel Rowland
1802 Thomas Lowe 
1803 William Snowden
1804 John Hope
1806 Rev Charles Stead Hope
1806 John Drewry
1807 Richard Leaper
1808 Henry Browne
1809 Samuel Rowland
1810 John Crompton 
1811 Thomas Haden
1812 Henry Lowe
1813 Thomas Lowe
1814 John Drewry
1815 Richard Leaper
1816 Rev Charles Stead Hope
1817 John Crompton
1818 Samuel Rowland Bryan 
1819 Thomas Haden
1820 James Oakes
1821 Henry Lowe
1822 Thomas Lowe
1823 John Drewry
1824 Richard Leaper
1825 Rev Charles Stead Hope
1826 John Crompton
1827 Samuel Rowland
1828 John Bell Crompton
1829 William Leaper Newton
1830 Rev Charles Stead Hope
1831 Charles Matthew Lowe 
1832 John Chatterton
1833 Douglas Fox 
1834 Richard Wright Haden 
1835 Joseph Strutt
1836 William Leaper Newton 
1837 John Bell Crompton 
1838 Douglas Fox 
1839 John Sandars 
1840 Francis Jessopp 
1841 Stephen Gamble 
1842 John Bell Crompton 
1843 John Barber
1844 John Moss
1845 William Eaton Mousley
1846 William Eaton Mousley
1847 
1848 Robert Forman
1849 James Haywood 
1850 Douglas Fox 
1851 J. G. Crompton
1852
1853 T. Madeley 
1854 William Goodwin
1855 Robert Pegg 
1856 Henry Franceys Gisborne 
1857 J.G. Crompton 
1858 John Gadsby 
1859 W. T. Cox  
1860 W. T. Cox 
1861 Henry Darby 
1862 Thomas Clarke
1863 S. Webster/Thomas Roe
1864 Thomas Roe
1865 Frederick Longden
1866 John Renals 
1867 T. Roe Jnr  
1868 Sir Thomas William Evans
1869 Robert Forman
1870 Samuel W. Cox  
1871 Samuel Leech 
1872 Sir John Smith 
1873 G. Wheeldon  
1874 George Holme Snr  
1875 John Turner 
1876 W Higginbottom 
1877 Sir Henry Howe Bemrose
1878 W. J. Smith 
1879 William Sowter
1880 Sir Abraham Woodiwiss
1881 Sir Abraham Woodiwiss
1882 Robert Russell
1883 William Hobson (twice mayor )
1884 Henry Fowkes  (died in office and replaced by William Hobson)
1885 Charles Leech
1886 Samuel Whitaker
1887 James William Newbold
1888 Sir Abraham Woodiwiss 
1889 William Heathcote 
1890 Sir Alfred Seale Haslam
1891 T. H. Harrison 
1892 William H. Marsden
1893 James Patrick Doherty 
1894  George Bottomley
1895  Henry Boam 
1896 Sir Thomas Roe
1897  Duesbury 
1898 Sir Edwin Thomas Ann
1899  T. Fletcher

20th century

1900–01  Edgar Home 
1901–02  Abraham Woodiwiss jnr 
1902–03   Frederick Strutt  (Liberal)
1903-04  Cornelius Boam
1904–05  W. Hart
1905–06  J P Doherty 
1906–07  Sir Edwin T. Ann
1907–08  Arthur Simpson 1851–1917
1908–09  R B Chamber
1909–10  William Blews Robotham
1910–11  Dr H Arnold Bemrose (Conservative)
1911–12  George Brigden  (1842–1928)
1912–13  Sir Thomas Roe
1913–14  W. G. Wilkins (Liberal)
1914–15  Samuel Johnson
1915–16  Albert Green
1916–17  H. J. Bonas
1917–18  Edward James Hulse 
1918–19  William Blews Robotham
1919–20  A. J. Eggleston
1920–21  Dr Robert Laurie (Liberal)
1921–22  William Robert Raynes (Labour)
1922–23  Oswald Ling (Conservative)
1923–24  Fred H Porter (Liberal)
1924–25  Alan Mycroft (Labour)
1925–26  Samuel Collis (Conservative)
1926–27  Arthur H. Domleo
1927–28  Arthur Sturgess
1928–29  S. Johnson
1929–30  J H H Grant (died in office 1930)
1930  Sir John Ferguson Bell 
1930–31  William Harold Hoare
1931–32  W H Salisbury (Labour)
1932–33  A E Moult (Conservative)
1933–34  H Slaney (Labour)
1934–35  Bertram Samuel Thorpe (1879-1946) (Conservative)
1935–36  John Clark
1936–37  Mrs Elizabeth Petty (Conservative)
1937–38  Edward Ernest Paulson (Labour)
1938–39  David S Butler(Conservative)
1939–40  Arthur Thomas Neal
1940–41  J. Pinchbeck
1941–42  H. G. Pattison
1942–43  Herbert A Hind
1943–44  Ernest Arthur Armstrong
1944–45  W. H. Philips
1945–46  T. Johnson
1946–47  C. R. Bates
1947–48  George F. Warburton
1948–49  Arthur Thomas Neal 
1949–50  Charles F. Bowmer
1950–51  Matthew Lowe (Labour)
1951–52  Zachariah Padgin Grayson
1952–53  Thomas Dennis 
1953–54  H J T Russell
1954–55  Alec Ling (Conservative)
1955–56  A. J. Luckett  
1956–57  J. H. Christmas (Labour)
1957–58  W. White (Labour)
1958–59  Mrs. F. Riggott 
1959–60  G. A. Collier 
1960–61  C. E. J. Andrews (Conservative)
1961–62  Tom Earnshaw
1962–63  Stuart W. Harper (Labour)
1963–64  Mrs Elsie Jane Mack (Conservative)
1964–65  John Dilworth – Labour
1965–66  W. H. Bonell
1966–67  Elsie Elizabeth Armstrong (1891–1981)
1967–68  Robert F. Stott
1968–69  Mrs Edith Wood (Conservative)
1969–70  Tom Taylor (Conservative)
1970–71  Miss Eleanor Grimwood-Taylor (1915 – 29 March 2008) (Conservative)
1971–72  Joe Carty (Labour)
1972–73  George Guest (Labour)
1973–74  A. J. Bussell (Conservative)
1974–75  George Salt (Labour)
1975–76  Cyril Ufton (Labour)
1976–77  W. H. Baker  (Labour)
1977–78  Jeffery Tillett (1927-2008) (Conservative)
1978–79  E. W. H. Reid (Conservative)
1979–80  Bob Newton (Labour)
1980–81  John Thorpe (Conservative)
1981–82  Florence Tunnicliffe  (Labour)
1982–83  Norman Glen (Conservative)
1983–84  Margaret Wood (Labour)
1984–85  Ron Longdon (1926-1987) (Conservative)
1985–86  W Harry Matthews (Labour)
1986–87  R. G. Keene (Conservative)
1987–88  Nancy Wawman (Labour)
1988–89  Leslie Shepley (Conservative)
1989–90  Ray Baxter (Labour)
1990–91  Barry Chadwick (Conservative)
1991–92  John Keith (Conservative)
1992–93  Harold Johnson (Conservative)
1993–94  Robin Wood (Conservative)
1994–95  Nirmal Dhindsa (Labour)
1995–96  John McGiven (Labour)
1996–97  Alan Mullarkey (Labour)
1997–98  John Fuller(Labour)
1998–99  Abdul Rehman (Labour)
1999–2000  Sara Bolton (Labour)

21st century

2000–01  Ashok Kalia (Labour)
2001–02  Janet Till (Labour)
2002–03  Robin Turner (Labour)
2003–04  Peter Berry (Conservative)
2004–05  Ruth Skelton (Liberal Democrat)
2005–06  Roy Webb (Conservative)
2006–07  John Ahern (Labour)
2007–08  Pauline Latham (Conservative)
2008–09  Barbara Jackson (Labour) 
2009–10  Sean Marshall (Conservative)
2010–11  Amar Nath (Conservative) 
2011–12  Les Allen(Liberal Democrat) 
2012–13  Lisa Higginbottom (Labour) 
2013–14  Fareed Hussain (Labour)
2014–15  Shiraz Khan (Labour)
2015–16 Paul Pegg (Labour)
2016–17 Linda Winter (Labour)
2017–18 John Whitby (Labour)
2018–19 Mike Carr (Liberal Democrat)
2019–20 Frank Harwood (Conservative then Independent June 2020)
2020–21 Frank Harwood (Independent then Liberal Democrat April 2021)
2021–2022 Robin Wood (Conservative)

References

 
Derby
Politics of Derby
mayors of Derby